That's Amore! is a reality television show that aired on MTV in early 2008. It is a spin-off of MTV's A Shot at Love with Tila Tequila. The show stars Domenico Nesci, who had been a contestant on A Shot at Love. One of the other contestants from the previous show, Ashley McNeely, helps Nesci find his true love as his consigliere. During the run of the series, 15 American women compete for Domenico's heart in a series of challenges. The winner was Megan Mirilovich.

Format
Similar to A Shot at Love with Tila Tequila, episodes typically include challenges (either team or individual) with a date with Domenico as the prize. Nesci deliberates with Ashley his consigliere near the end of the episode and an elimination ceremony takes place. During elimination, Domenico calls forward the women that he chooses to remain in the mansion and presents them with an Italian flag while asking "Will you be my bambina?"

Although Megan won, she and Domenico didn't stay together long, breaking up after only a month. It was report they just moved on with their lives.

Personal life
Domenico Nesci is 5-foot-7-inch tall. He was born in the northern Italian city Bergamo, but his parents were from Calabria. He lived in Australia before moving to USA.

Episodes
Special: Domenico's Passport to Love (originally aired February 24, 2008)
Ep. 1 Love is in the Hair (originally aired March 2, 2008)
Ep. 2 Rival Sirens (originally aired March 9, 2008)
Ep. 3 Love Hurts (originally aired March 16, 2008)
Ep. 4 Disco Disaster (originally aired March 23, 2008)
Ep. 5 Go Kart 4 My Heart (originally aired March 30, 2008)
Ep. 6 We're Going to Italy! (originally aired April 6, 2008)

Contestants

Call-out order

 The contestant won the competition.
 The contestant won a date with Domenico.
 The contestant won 2 dates with Domenico.
 The contestant won a date with Domenico, but was removed from the competition due to violence.
 The contestant won a date with Domenico, but was eliminated.
 The contestant was eliminated.

References

External links
Official site
Megan wins the competition over Kim
 

2000s American reality television series
2008 American television series debuts
2008 American television series endings
American dating and relationship reality television series
MTV game shows
2000s American game shows
MTV original programming